Chaleeda Gilbert (born February 21, 2001), known mononymously as Chaleeda, is a Thai-British singer, actress, lyricist and YouTuber. She rose to fame in Malaysia as one of the contestants of the season two of Big Stage, a Malaysian reality television show produced by Astro.

Career
She started her music career at the age of 11 and became a member of the Thai girl group Tweenie 90' and began posting cover songs on YouTube, one of which was Justin Bieber's "Love Yourself", garnered over 1.2 million views within five days.

In 2017, she signed a contract with Malaysian talent management company, Rocketfuel Entertainment, as one of their new artists making Gilbert as the first regional artist to signed with the Rocketfuel.

She then releases her debut single under the label, a Thai-languaged "Ready For Love" featuring Thai rapper Twopee and amessed 1.5 million views on YouTube since its launch.

Gilbert makes her acting debut with 2017 Thai horror film The Promise. She embarked her first mini concert, Chaleeda Showcase which held at The Bee, Publika on December 14.

In April 2018, she releases "Pretty Boy" as her third single, co-written by Kuizz and Bil Musa. The music video has gained 1,196,495 views on YouTube.

In April 2021 After more than a year of musical inactivity she releases her first song written by her, titled "cigarettes", and two months later she releases her second song written by her titled "caught up".

Big Stage Season 2
Chaleeda participates in a Malaysian reality show, Big Stage Season 2 which airs on Astro Ria. Gilbert, along with Syada Amzah were elimated on week 5 and 8 contestants who were stepped up on sixth week.

Personal life
Chaleeda is from Thai and British descent. Apart of her native Thai, she also fluent in English and Malay. She divides her time between Bangkok and Kuala Lumpur.

Chaleeda cites Drake, Rihanna, August Alsina and Melanie Martinez as her idols.

Discography

Filmography

Television
 2022 Pleng Bin Bai Ngiw (2022) (CHANGE2561/Amarin TV) as Jieab (Jomthong's sister)

Series
 2019 The Stranded เคว้ง (/Netflix) as Arisa (อริสา)
 2022 Club Friday The Series Love Seasons Celebration Ep. Broken Anniversary (The One Enterprise-CHANGE2561/One 31) as
 2022 The Warp Effect (The One Enterprise-GMMTV/GMM 25) as Khim with Phuwin Tangsakyuen

Concerts
 Chaleeda Showcase (2017)

Music video appearances 
 20

MC
 Online 
 2021 : On Air YouTube:Chaleeda

References

External links
 

2001 births
Living people
Chaleeda Gilbert
Chaleeda Gilbert
Chaleeda Gilbert
Chaleeda Gilbert
Chaleeda Gilbert
Thai television personalities
Chaleeda Gilbert